Enrique Alfaro (born 11 December 1974) is a Mexican former football midfielder. He spent most of his career with Toluca, playing from 1994 to 2002.

An attacking midfielder who normally lined up on the right side of the midfield line or in a three-forward attack, Alfaro played a key part in Toluca's championship runs during the Verano tournaments of 1998, 1999, and 2000.

Alfaro also had a successful international career. As part of the Under-23 selection, he represented Mexico at the 1996 Summer Olympics in Atlanta, appearing in all four matches. He also collected 20 full caps for Mexico, including five qualifiers for the 1998 FIFA World Cup, and played on Mexico's title-winning squad at the 1998 CONCACAF Gold Cup. A favorite selection at the beginning of the regime of Bora Milutinovic, Alfaro gradually slipped down the pecking order with the emergence of Luis Hernandez and Cuauhtémoc Blanco as the preferred strikers under Milutinovic's successor, Manuel Lapuente. He collected his first cap against Bolivia in a 1–0 win at the Cotton Bowl in Dallas on 8 June 1996, and made his last international appearance on 18 March 1998, in a 1–1 draw with Paraguay.

References

External links
 
 

1974 births
Living people
CONCACAF Gold Cup-winning players
Footballers at the 1996 Summer Olympics
Olympic footballers of Mexico
Deportivo Toluca F.C. players
Footballers from Mexico City
Association football midfielders
Mexico international footballers
1998 CONCACAF Gold Cup players
Mexican footballers